Gavin Malloch (18 July 1905 – 10 December 1974) was a Scottish footballer who played as a left half for Derby County, Sheffield Wednesday, Millwall, Barrow and Morton. He was a member of the Derby team that were runners-up in the 1929–30 Football League campaign, and after switching to that season's champions Wednesday, he was part of the Owls squad when they finished third in 1930–31 and 1931–32, but was no longer a regular by the time they won the FA Cup in 1935, making no contribution to the run.

He was not related to Jock Malloch, another Scot who was with Sheffield Wednesday a generation earlier.

References

Scottish footballers
Footballers from Glasgow
1905 births
1974 deaths
People from Govan
Millwall F.C. players
Greenock Morton F.C. players
Benburb F.C. players
Derby County F.C. players
Sheffield Wednesday F.C. players
Barrow A.F.C. players
Association football wing halves
Scottish Junior Football Association players
Scottish Football League players
English Football League players